Theasinensin C is polyphenol flavonoid from black tea (Thea sinensis).

See also 
 Theasinensin A
 Theasinensin B

References 
 
 

Flavanols
Polyphenols
Biphenyls